Kapiti or Kāpiti may refer to:

Kapiti Island, an island a short distance off the New Zealand coast north of Wellington
Kapiti Coast District, the local government district which includes much of the Kapiti Coast
Kapiti Coast Airport, an airport in Paraparaumu
Kapiti College, a high school on the Kapiti Coast
Kapiti Expressway, a 4 lane highway
Kapiti Fine Foods, a company which produces dairy-related products
Kapiti Line, a suburban railway in Wellington
Kapiti Urban Area, the urban area for the Kapiti Coast
Kapiti (New Zealand electorate), a former Parliamentary electorate

See also